Terry O'Neill (born c. 1953) is an American feminist, civil rights attorney, and professor. She was the president of the National Organization for Women (NOW) from 2009 to 2017, as well as president of the NOW Foundation and chair of the NOW Political Action Committees.

Education and family
O'Neill graduated from Rosemary Hall (now Choate Rosemary Hall), and holds a bachelor's degree in French with distinction from Northwestern University and a J.D. degree magna cum laude from the Tulane University Law School. She has one daughter. According to O'Neill her first husband beat her after a dispute when she was 22 years old, and she left him to live with her parents in New Orleans. She is amicably divorced from her second husband.

Early career
O'Neill got her start in politics in the early 1990s when David Duke ran for governor of Louisiana. At the time she was a professor of Law at Tulane University in New Orleans. She signed on with the Stop Duke Campaign and contributed by going door to door in her uptown neighborhood getting out the vote against Duke. The following year she joined NOW.

She served as NOW's vice president for membership from 2001 to 2005. She taught feminist legal theory and international women's rights law, corporate law and legal ethics at Tulane and the UC Davis School of Law. She is a past president of Louisiana NOW, Maryland NOW and New Orleans NOW and member of the National Racial Diversity Committee. She served on the NOW National Board, representing the Mid-South Region (2000–2001) and the Mid-Atlantic Region (2007–2009).

NOW election
O'Neill was elected as part of a four-member team called "Feminist Leadership NOW" that took office July 21, 2009. Bonnie Grabenhofer of Illinois is executive vice president, Erin Matson from Minnesota became action vice president, and  Allendra Letsome of Maryland became membership vice president. O'Neill resigned from her position as chief of staff to Councilwoman Duchy Trachtenberg of Montgomery County, Maryland in June 2009, to work full-time for NOW. The election was very close—won by eight votes, with outgoing president Kim Gandy supporting the other team led by Latifa Lyles, a 33-year-old African American who emphasized youth, diversity and new technology.

Agenda
The Washington Post said she "campaigned to reenergize what she called an outsider strategy of 'tapping into energy and outrage' felt by grass-roots feminists across the country over 'the ground we lost' during the Bush administration".

NOW addresses are abortion rights, reproductive rights issues, violence against women, constitutional equality, promoting diversity, ending racism, LGBT rights, and economic justice.

She was strongly critical of the Stupak-Pitts Amendment, which attempted to place limits on taxpayer-funding of abortions (except in the cases of rape, incest, and life of the mother) in the context of the November 2009 Affordable Care Act. The amendment was ultimately not included in the bill.

O'Neill has said the struggle against transphobia is a feminist issue.

Notes

External links

Presidents of the National Organization for Women
American women chief executives
American feminists
Choate Rosemary Hall alumni
Northwestern University alumni
Tulane University Law School alumni
Lawyers from New Orleans
Living people
American women lawyers
American nonprofit chief executives
1950s births
21st-century American women